Christmas Songs is the third EP album by California punk rock band Bad Religion, released October 29, 2013 on Epitaph Records. It is their first full-length Christmas album, featuring eight covers of seasonal songs and an "Andy Wallace mix" version of "American Jesus". This is also the first Bad Religion album not to feature Greg Hetson on guitar since 1983's Into the Unknown, although he appears on "American Jesus", and the first time they recorded as a five-piece since 2000's The New America. Christmas Songs is also Bad Religion's final release with Brooks Wackerman on drums.

Background
Although Bad Religion had played many Christmas songs in the past, mostly during the KROQ Almost Acoustic Christmas shows, the band had reportedly turned down offers to release a Christmas album. After three days of speculation, the official announcement of Christmas Songs came via Epitaph press release on September 10, 2013. 20% of the proceeds from Christmas Songs will go to SNAP (Survivors Network of those Abused by Priests).

Cover
The cover picture comes from a picture titled "New Shoes" by Gerald Waller (Austria 1946). It is of an orphan boy who received new shoes from the American Red Cross.

Reception

Critical

Christmas Songs received mixed reviews from music critics upon its release. At Metacritic, which assigns a normalized rating out of 100 to reviews from mainstream critics, the album has received an average score of 60, based on 15 reviews, indicating "mixed or average" reviews.

Track listing

Personnel
 Greg Graffin – lead vocals
 Brett Gurewitz – guitar, backing vocals
 Brian Baker – lead guitar
 Jay Bentley – bass, backing vocals
 Brooks Wackerman – drums

Additional Musicians
 Greg Hetson – guitar on "American Jesus"
 Bobby Schayer – drums on "American Jesus"

Chart performance

References

External links

Christmas Songs at YouTube (streamed copy where licensed)

2013 Christmas albums
Bad Religion albums
2013 EPs
Covers EPs
Epitaph Records EPs
Charity albums
Christmas albums by American artists
Rock Christmas albums